Lorca Deportiva Club de Fútbol, S.A.D. was a Spanish football club in Lorca, in the autonomous community of Murcia. Founded in 2002 it was dissolved ten years later, and held home matches at Estadio Francisco Artés Carrasco, which seats 8,000.

History
Lorca Deportiva was founded in 2002, right after the defunction of Lorca Club de Fútbol which had been born eight years earlier. The new club started in the fourth division after acquiring the place of CD Balsicas, and was promoted to the third level at the first attempt.

As rookies in the third tier, Lorca qualified for the play-offs after occupying the second place in the regular season. Next season the team finished fourth, but this time managed to promote to the division two: with Unai Emery – who later managed Paris Saint-Germain and Arsenal F.C. – in the position of manager, it narrowly missed on a new promotion, finishing just five points behind last La Liga promotee Levante UD.

After Emery's departure, with many first-team players also leaving, Lorca was relegated the following campaign. In the middle of 2009, although it had just finished second in its group, economic issues led to another drop, to the fourth division.

For the 2010–11 season, the club was relocated to nearby Totana and renamed LD Olímpico. On 18 October 2010, amidst serious economic problems, it retired from competition and folded, without chairman or players – all 93 points that the team would lose for not showing up in the remaining 31 fixtures of the season were equally distributed by their opponents, and Lorca was finally dissolved in 2012.

Season to season

2 seasons in Segunda División
4 seasons in Segunda División B
3 seasons in Tercera División

References

External links

Official website 
Futbolme team profile 

 
Defunct football clubs in the Region of Murcia
Association football clubs established in 2002
Association football clubs disestablished in 2012
Lorca, Spain
2002 establishments in Spain
2012 disestablishments in Spain
Segunda División clubs